Marcos Argüello (born 28 July 1981 in Villa Maria, Córdoba) is an Argentinian football goalkeeper who plays for Crucero del Norte in the Torneo Federal A.

Anorthosis Famagusta
In summer 2010 Marcos Argüello signed a contract with Anorthosis. In the beginning Marcos Argüello was the second goalkeeper in back of Matúš Kozáčik. Marcos Argüello make his debut against HNK Šibenik. Guillermo Ángel Hoyos put him in starting line up. Marcos Argüello was the main reason than Anorthosis was able to qualify for 4th Round of UEFA Europa League.

Later on, Marcos Argüello became permanent member of the team's starting 11. He became famous for his jump attempts repelling every attempt of opposite forwards. Furthermore, his great goalkeeping abilities did not allow to Anorthosis to keep him for long because of the interest that some greater in value and qualification clubs offered.

External links 
 

1981 births
Living people
Argentine expatriate footballers
Argentine footballers
Chacarita Juniors footballers
Talleres de Córdoba footballers
Defensa y Justicia footballers
Club Guaraní players
Club Bolívar players
Textil Mandiyú footballers
Oriente Petrolero players
Anorthosis Famagusta F.C. players
Orihuela CF players
Club Atlético Douglas Haig players
Crucero del Norte footballers
Torneo Federal A players
Bolivian Primera División players
Segunda División B players
Cypriot First Division players
Argentine expatriate sportspeople in Paraguay
Expatriate footballers in Paraguay
Argentine expatriate sportspeople in Bolivia
Expatriate footballers in Bolivia
Argentine expatriate sportspeople in Cyprus
Expatriate footballers in Cyprus
Argentine expatriate sportspeople in Spain
Expatriate footballers in Spain
Association football goalkeepers